Since April 23, 1987, the Anti-Defamation League has given award the Courage to Care Award to honor rescuers of Jews during the Holocaust. In 2011, the award was renamed the Jan Karski Courage to Care Award in honor of one of its 1988 recipients, Jan Karski, a Polish Righteous who provided one of the first eyewitness accounts of the Final Solution to the West.

Background
Since 1962, the Yad Vashem Holocaust Martyrs' and Heroes' Remembrance Authority conferred the title "Righteous Among the Nations" on non-Jews who risked their lives to save Jews. Yad Vashem was established in 1953 to perpetuate the memory of the Jewish world destroyed in the Holocaust. A special committee is impaneled to study the evidence gathered from survivors and documents in order to establish the authenticity of each rescue story. To date, over 9,000 men and women have been so honored by Yad Vashem.

In addition to examining its own records, ADL consults with Yad Vashem before conferring the Courage to Care award. The Courage to Care program is sponsored by Eileen Ludwig Greenland.

Award 
The award plaque features miniature bas-reliefs depicting the backdrop for the rescuers’ exceptional deeds during the Nazi persecution, deportation and murder of millions of Jews. It is a replica of the plaques which constitute the Holocaust Memorial Wall created by noted sculptor Arbit Blatas, who also created the Holocaust Memorial in Paris and the display in the old ghetto of Venice. The award is given during specific programs and ceremonies sponsored by the ADL, often occurring several times a year, when possible.

Miep Gies and her husband Jan received the first Courage to Care award on Thursday, April 23, 1987.

Recipients 
Courage to Care honorees.

 János Eszterházy, 2011 
 Irene Gut Opdyke, 2009 
 Gilberto Bosques Saldivar, 2008 
 Eduardo Propper de Callejón, 2008 
 Clara M. Ambrus (Bayer), 2008 
 Martha and Waitstill Sharp, 2007 
 Khaled Abdelwahhab, 2007 
 Ernst Leitz II, 2007 
 Mefail and Njazi Biçaku, 2007 
 Hiram "Harry" Bingham IV, 2006 
 Nicholas Winton, 2006 
 Konstantin Koslovsky, 2006 
 The People of Turkey, (accepted by Prime Minister Recep Tayyip Erdogan, 2005)
 Giovanni Palatucci, 2004 
 Dimitrios P. Spiliakos, 2004 
 Kostas Nikolaou, 2003 
 Johanna Vos, 2003 
 The Partisans of Riccone, Italy, 2003 
 Hans Georg Calmeyer, 2002 
 Hannah Pick-Goslar, 2000 
 Monsignor Beniamo Schivo, 1999 
 The People of Bulgaria (accepted by President Petar Stoyanov), 1998 
 Shyqyri Myrto, 1997 
 Renia & Jerzy Kozminski, 1996 
 Emilie & Oskar Schindler, 1993 
 Alice & Paul Paulus, 1993 
 People of Denmark, 1993 
 Peter Vlcko, 1991 
 Stefania Burzminski née Podgórska, 1991 
 Mela & Alex Roslan, 1990 
 Friedrich Born, 1990 
 Marion P. Pritchard, 1990 
 Jan and Anna Puchalski, 1989 
 Le Chambon-sur-Lignon, 1989 
 Chiune Sugihara, 1989 
 Selahattin Ülkümen, 1988 
 Jan Karski, 1988 
 Aristides De Sousa Mendes, 1987 
 Jan & Miep Gies, 1987

See also
Courage to Care (organization)
The Courage to Care (film)

References

Humanitarian and service awards
Courage awards
Anti-Defamation League